At a height of , Great Dun Fell is the second-highest mountain in England's Pennines, lying   south along the watershed from Cross Fell, its higher neighbour. Together with its smaller twin, Little Dun Fell, which reaches , it forms a stepping-stone for the Pennine Way on its long climb up from Dufton. It lies within the historic county boundaries of Westmorland and the modern county of Cumbria.

Radar station
At the summit there is a radar station which is operated by National Air Traffic Services and is a key part of the Air Traffic Control system for Northern England and Southern Scotland. A radome containing Primary Surveillance radar (PSR) and Secondary Surveillance Radar (SSR) antennas, various towers and fencing crown the summit. Alfred Wainwright abhorred the old radio station (removed in the 1980s) in his book Pennine Way Companion.

The construction of the radar station led to the repaving of a tarred road to the summit, which became Britain's highest road. This road is marked as private from just above the village of Knock, and is not open to public motor vehicles. However, it is a bridleway until shortly before the radar station, so it is open to walkers, cyclists and horseriders.

Field station 
The University of Manchester formerly had a permanent meteorological observatory at the Great Dun Fell site. It has hosted a number of field experiments doing research into clouds and their interactions with pollution. As the summit is in cloud for two thirds of the year it is an ideal location for this type of research. The university still has the option to use the site for short-term measurement periods.

Hushing
There are the remains of hushing gulleys on the slopes of the mountain, created during lead mining of the industrial revolution.

Climate
Using the -3°C isotherm, Great Dun Fell has an altitude influenced oceanic climate (Köppen Climate Classification Cfc), closely bordering an alpine tundra climate (ET) due to a July mean of exactly . The Met Office station publishes only temperature and frost averages. The summers are cool due to elevation. Considering its elevation and a latitude of over 54 degrees, winters are extremely mild due to oceanic influences.

References

External links
Cycling Uphill

Hewitts of England
Mountains and hills of the Pennines
Mountains and hills of Cumbria
Nuttalls